Paul Pauley (1886–1938) was a French stage and film actor.

Selected filmography
 Count Kostia (1925)
 The Man in Evening Clothes (1931)
 Black and White (1931)
 Aces of the Turf (1932)
 Étienne (1933)
 The Midnight Prince (1934)
 Rothchild (1934)
 Speak to Me of Love (1935)
 You Can't Fool Antoinette (1936)
 Mercadet (1936)
 Beethoven's Great Love (1937)
 My Little Marquise (1937)

References

Bibliography
 Goble, Alan. The Complete Index to Literary Sources in Film. Walter de Gruyter, 1999.

External links

1886 births
1938 deaths
French male film actors
French male stage actors
Male actors from Paris